Baitadi District, historical name “Bairath”  (बैराथ),  a part of Sudurpashchim Province, is one of the 77 districts of Nepal. It is a Hill district. The Baitadi district entails 56 village development councils (VDCs) and two municipality in the past. Now, by federal policy there are 10 local units; 4 Municipalities (Dashrath Chand, Patan, Melauli and Purchudi) and 6 Rural Municipalities ( Surnaya, Sigas, Shivnath, Pancheshwor, Dogada Kedar and Dilasaini). Baitadi falls into the farthest western regional district of Nepal touching Jhulaghat, India, Nepal's neighboring country, to its border.

History
Baitadi  was part of Kumaon Kingdom until gorkha invasion of Kumaon in 1791, the region once a part of the Great Katyuri's Kingdom.  After the fall of that Kingdom, around the 10th century,  Khas King Ashok Challa of Sapadalaksh (Karnali Zone or Dullu, Dailekh) seized most of that part of the Katyuri's Kingdom, including Baitadi. There were three major centres of Khas King i.e., (1)   Bairath (Baitadi) (2)  Kamadesh (kali kumaun) and (3)  Kedarbhumi (Garhwal) to rule in a Central Himalaya. According to the historical folk-tales in Baitadi it was one of the Chand Kings who fought with the Khas king and established a sovereign state for the Chand dynasty in Baitadi. These tales resembled a historical story of the establishment of Kumaun Kingdom. One of the view of the historians of Uttarakhand, a state in India, Nepal's neighboring country,  suggest that it was Thohar Chand who was responsible for establishing the Chand dynasty in Kali-Kumaun.  He then changed his name to Abhai Chand after he became a King. Badri Dutt Pandey written history of Kumaun book has quoted the following story about the history of Kumaun.

Gyan Chand (1376 A.D)  was the first ruler of the Chand Dynasty of Champawat who was part of the third generation from Thohar Chand or Abhai Chand. Gyan Chand's grandfather, Trilok Chand, and his father, Kalyan Chand, were rulers of Baitadi, according to the folk tales.

Rulers:

The Name of the Kings who ruled in Baitadi were:

Thohar- Ahai Chand (1261–1281 AD)
Trilok Chand
Kalyan Chand
Gyan Chand
 (1376 AD)
Karm Chand
Bharati Chand
Ratan Chand
Megh Chand (1503 AD)
Kirti Chand
Kalyan Chand
Rudra Chand (1580 AD)

Laxman Chand
Dilip Chand
Vijay Chand
Trimal Chand
Baj Bhadur Chand
Udyot Chand
Gyan Chand- II (1706 AD)
Jagat Chand
Debi Chand
Kalyan Chand- II (1731AD)
Deep Chand

Gorkha kingdom annexed Kumaon in 1791 and merged baitadi in Doti District until 1885. Baitadi and Dadeldhura had same "Bada-Hakim" (District Administrators) so those two districts jointly used to call Baitadi-Dadeldhura district until 1956. The "Baitadi-Dadeldhura" district named Mahakali District after 1956. In 1956 four county (Thums) of Baitadi separated and made a sub-district of Mahakali district. From 1956 to 1962 "Mahakali district" had three sub-districts.
 Dadeldhura
 Baitadi
 Chamba

In 1962, Darchula (Chamba) separated from Baitadi District.

Demographics

According to the 2011 census, Baitadi District has a population of 250,898, with an absentee population of 21,038, roughly equal to that of the nation of Vanuatu. Baitadi District has a sex ratio of 87:95 of which 133,491 are female., The largest ethnic group is Khas/Chhetri make 76% of total population. Bahun, Thakuri and sanyasi/giri makes 21% khas dalit make 3%. of total population.

At the time of the 2011 Nepal census, 97.7% of the population in the district spoke Baitadeli, 1.0% Nepali and 0.8% Doteli as their first language.

Geography and climate

Administration
The district is administered by District Coordination Committee (Legislative), District Administration Office (Executive) and District Court (Judicial) as follows:

Administrative divisions
The district consists of ten municipalities, out of which four are urban municipalities and three are rural municipalities. These are as follows:
 Dasharathchand Municipality
 Patan Municipality
 Melauli Municipality
 Purchaudi Municipality
 Sunarya Rural Municipality
 Sigas Rural Municipality
 Shivanath Rural Municipality
 Pancheshwor Rural Municipality
 Dogdakedar Rural Municipality
 Dilasaini Rural Municipality

Former Village Development Committees 
Prior to the restructuring of the district, Baitadi District consisted of the following municipalities and Village development committees:

 SALENA
Amchoura
 FYAULI
 Barakot
 khadeni
 Basantapur
 Basuling
 Bhatana
 Bhumeshwar
 Bijayapur
 Bishalpur
 Bumiraj
 Nwadeu
 Chaukham
 Sibnath
 Dehimandau
 Deulek
 Dhungad
 Dilasaini
 Durga Bhabani
 Durgasthan
 Gurukhola
 Gajari
 Giregada
 Gokuleshwar
 Gwallek
 Hat
 Hatairaj
 Jagannath
 Kailpal
 Kataujpani
 Kotila
 Kotpetara
 Kulau
 Kuwakot
 Mahadevsthan
 Mahakali
 Maharudra
 Malladehi
 Nagarjun
 Siddheshwar
 Sharmali
 Raudidewal
 Rauleshwar
 Giregada
 Srikedar
 Srikot
 Sankarpur
 Shikarpur

Sports
Volleyball is the most popular sport in Baitadi. Besides, Cricket is equally popular. Baitadi has won many regional competitions; It is home to many eminent national players for the Nepal national cricket team.

Communication
Saugaat FM 103.6 MHz, Samsher, FM 106.6 MHz and Ninglashaini FM 94.0 MHz are the radio stations of the Baitadi District.
Radio Pura Sanchar 97.0 MHz is also in the Baitadi District.

Agriculture
Corn and wheat are the main crops of this region, but millet, maize and rice are also grown for home use. Commercial farming is not popular in this region. Some fruits are grown and exported to the nearby headquarters Bhimdatta and Dhangadhi—particularly Mandarins, Oranges, Lemons, and sometimes Emblica. The latter is found both domesticated and growing wild in the forests. Sapindus or Soapnut is also grown and used for washing clothes as well a bodies. Sapindus is also exported to nearby towns.

Sites of interest 
The Gwallek Kedar sacred forest, situated wholly in Baitadi district, is considered the most important 'Kedar' - abode of Mahadev - of the four Kedars that lie along the Indo-Nepal border between western Nepal and Uttarakhand. As such, it is an important regional pilgrimage site.

References

Sources
 
 A New History Of Uttarakhand   :   Dr. Y. S. Kathoch
 History of Doti Kingdom        :   Bhattarai
Spell Change amchour from amchoura by uttam chand

 
Districts of Nepal established during Rana regime or before